The Gamma People is a 1956 British-American black-and-white science fiction film, produced by John Gossage, directed by John Gilling, that stars Paul Douglas, Eva Bartok, and Leslie Phillips. The film was distributed by Columbia Pictures and evolved from a script treatment originally written in the early 1950s by Robert Aldrich. The Gamma People was released theatrically in the U.S. as a double feature with the 1956 British science fiction film 1984.

Plot 
A railroad passenger car carrying a reporter and his photographer mysteriously breaks away from its locomotive, accidentally ending up on a remote sidetrack in Gudavia, an isolated Ruritanian-style, one-village dictatorship. The newsmen discover a mad scientist using gamma rays to turn the country's youth into either geniuses or subhumans.

Cast
 Paul Douglas as Mike Wilson
 Eva Bartok as Paula Wendt
 Leslie Phillips as Howard Meade
 Walter Rilla as Boronski
 Philip Leaver as Koerner  
 Martin Miller as Lochner 
 Michael Caridia as Hugo Wendt  
 Pauline Drewett as Hedda Lochner  
 Jocelyn Lane as Anna  
 Olaf Pooley as Bikstein  
 Rosalie Crutchley as Frau Bikstein  
 Leonard Sachs as Telegraph Clerk  
 Paul Hardtmuth as Hans
 Cyril Chamberlain as Graf

Production 
In June 1951, Irving Allen announced he would make The Gamma People in Austria with Brian Donlevy and Virginia Grey. It was based on a screenplay by Oliver Crawford and a story by Louis Pollock. Allen said the script was about German scientific experiments during the war which caused cells to mutate. He said he had finance from the United States and Austria. Allen did a location trip to Austria in July.

In December 1951 Allen announced he had formed Warwick Productions with Albert Broccoli, but that he still intended to make The Gamma People with Robert Aldrich. Dick Powell was slated to star.

The film would not be made for another three years. Paul Douglas was cast in the lead and Warwick wanted Trevor Howard to co-star. Filming took place in Austria in July 1955. Patricia Medina was meant to co-star, but then was called in for another commitment, on a Sam Katzman film. Eva Bartók took her place.

Writer Louis Pollock would be blacklisted for five years, having been confused for Los Angeles clothier, Louis Pollack, who refused to give testimony to the House Un-American Activities Committee.

See also
List of British films of 1956

References

External links
 
 
 
 
 
Review of film at Variety

1956 films
British science fiction films
Columbia Pictures films
Films directed by John Gilling
Films set in Europe
1950s science fiction films
Films shot at MGM-British Studios
1950s English-language films
American science fiction films
American black-and-white films
British black-and-white films
1950s American films
1950s British films